Pinto's spinetail (Synallaxis infuscata) is a species of bird in the family Furnariidae. It is also known as the plain spinetail, Alagoas spinetail or tatac.
It is endemic to north-eastern Brazil.
Its natural habitats are subtropical or tropical moist lowland forest, subtropical or tropical moist shrubland, and plantations.
It is threatened by habitat loss.

References

External links
BirdLife Species Factsheet.

Pinto's spinetail
Birds of the Atlantic Forest
Endemic birds of Brazil
Pinto's spinetail
Taxonomy articles created by Polbot